Rodrigo Nicanor Mora Núñez (born 29 October 1987) is a former Uruguayan professional footballer who played as a striker.

Club career
Born in Rivera, Mora started his professional career with modest Juventud de Las Piedras. In 2008, aged 20, he signed for top division outfit Defensor Sporting.

After a relatively successful first season, helping La Farola finish third in the Apertura and win the Clausura, he found himself on the bench more often than not in the following, and subsequently left for fellow league outfit Cerro. At his new team he scored nine goals in 2009–10, and a further five in the campaign's Copa Libertadores, four of them in the qualifying rounds against teams in his country.

He was purchased back for the 2010–11 season, and finished the Apertura tournament with 11 goals – second-best in the competition behind Nacional's Santiago García – as his team ranked in top position. In January 2011 he signed for Benfica on a free transfer, effective as of July.

He was officially presented by the Portuguese club on 1 July, alongside Nolito. He played his first official game on 14 October in a Portuguese Cup game against Portimonense, replacing Rodrigo in the 78th minute of a 2–0 away win.

In January 2012, after failing to establish himself at Benfica, he joined Peñarol on a six-month loan. He signed on loan for River Plate in August, with the option of making the move permanent after a year. In July 2013, he signed with River Plate, in exchange for Rogelio Funes Mori. After a brief stint on loan in Club Universidad de Chile, he returned to the team mid-2014 on request of new manager Marcelo Gallardo, and was an integral part of the team that won the 2014 Copa Sudamericana, the 2015 Recopa Sudamericana and the 2015 Copa Libertadores.

As of 2017 Mora has been ridden unable to play any football due to a necrosis.

Honours
River Plate
Copa Sudamericana: 2014
Recopa Sudamericana: 2015, 2016
Copa Libertadores: 2015, 2018
Suruga Bank Championship: 2015
Copa Argentina: 2016
Supercopa Argentina: 2017

References

External links

1987 births
Living people
People from Rivera Department
Uruguayan footballers
Uruguayan expatriate footballers
Association football forwards
Juventud de Las Piedras players
Defensor Sporting players
C.A. Cerro players
Peñarol players
Universidad de Chile footballers
Club Atlético River Plate footballers
S.L. Benfica footballers
Uruguayan Primera División players
Primeira Liga players
Chilean Primera División players
Argentine Primera División players
Expatriate footballers in Chile
Expatriate footballers in Portugal
Expatriate footballers in Argentina
The Challenge (TV series) contestants